The ÍBV women's handball team is the women's handball department of ÍBV-íþróttafélag (English: ÍBV sports club). As of the 2017-2018 season, they play in the Úrvalsdeild kvenna.

History
ÍBV won their first women's national championship in 2000 and followed up by winning it in 2003, 2004 and 2006.

Coaches
 Hrafnhildur Skúladóttir 2015-2019
 Sigurður Bragason 2019-present

Notable players
 Sandra Erlingsdóttir

Trophies and achievements
 Icelandic champions (4):
 2000, 2003, 2004, 2006
 Icelandic Handball Cup (3):
 2001, 2002, 2004
 Division I (2):
 1986, 1988

Source

Team

Current squad
Squad for the 2022-23 season

Goalkeepers
 1  Bernódía Sif Sigurðardóttir
 12  Tara Sól Úranusdóttir 
 16  Dröfn Haraldsdóttir
 27  Marta Wawrzynkowska
Wingers
RW
 21  Sara Dröfn Richardsdóttir
LW
 2  Ingibjørg Olsen
 6  Harpa Valey Gylfadóttir
 34  Amelia Dís Einársdóttir
Line players
 8  Herdis Eiriksdóttir
 14  Elisa Eliasdóttir
 22  Briet Omarsdóttir

Back players
LB
 15  Karolina Olszowa
 29  Súnna Jónsdóttir
CB
 7  Hrafnhildur Hanna Þrastardóttir
 9  Olöf Maria Stefansdóttir
RB
 5  Alexandra Ósk Viktorsdóttir
 11  Birna Berg Haraldsdóttir
 23  Ásta Júlíusdóttir

References

External links
 

Handball teams in Iceland
Women's handball clubs
Íþróttabandalag Vestmannaeyja